The Radeon 300 series is a series of graphics processors developed by AMD. All of the GPUs of the series are produced in 28 nm format and use the Graphics Core Next (GCN) micro-architecture.

The series includes the Fiji and Tonga GPU dies based on AMD's GCN 3 or "Volcanic Islands" architecture, which had originally been introduced with the Tonga based (though cut-down) R9 285 slightly earlier. Some of the cards in the series include the Fiji based flagship AMD Radeon R9 Fury X, cut-down Radeon R9 Fury and small form factor Radeon R9 Nano, which are the first GPUs to feature High Bandwidth Memory (HBM) technology, which AMD co-developed in partnership with SK Hynix. HBM is faster and more power efficient than GDDR5 memory, though also more expensive. However, the remaining GPUs in the series outside the Tonga based R9 380 and R9 380X are based on previous generation GPUs with revised power management, and therefore only feature GDDR5 memory (something Tonga does as well). The Radeon 300 series cards including the R9 390X were released on June 18, 2015. The flagship device, the Radeon R9 Fury X, was released on June 24, 2015, with the dual-GPU variant, the Radeon Pro Duo, being released on April 26, 2016.

Micro-architecture and instruction set 
The R9 380/X along with the R9 Fury & Nano series were AMD's first cards (after the earlier R9 285) to use the third iteration of their GCN instruction set and micro-architecture. The other cards in the series feature first and second gen iterations of GCN. The table below details which GCN-generation each chip belongs to.

Ancillary ASICs 
Any ancillary ASICs present on the chips are being developed independently of the core architecture and have their own version name schemes.

Multi-monitor support

The AMD Eyefinity branded on-die display controllers were introduced in September 2009 in the Radeon HD 5000 Series and have been present in all products since.

AMD TrueAudio 

AMD TrueAudio was introduced with the AMD Radeon Rx 200 Series, but can only be found on the dies of GCN 2nd gen and later products.

Video acceleration 
AMD's SIP core for video acceleration, Unified Video Decoder and Video Coding Engine, are found on all GPUs and are supported by AMD Catalyst and by the open-source Radeon graphics driver.

Frame limiter
A new feature to the lineup allows users to reduce power consumption by not rendering unnecessary frames. It is user configurable.

LiquidVR support
LiquidVR is a technology that improves the smoothness of virtual reality. The aim is to reduce latency between hardware so that the hardware can keep up with the user's head movement, eliminating the motion sickness. A particular focus is on dual GPU setups where each GPU now renders for one eye individually of the display.

Virtual super resolution support
Originally introduced with the previous generation R9 285 and R9 290 series graphics cards, this feature allows users to run games with higher image quality by rendering frames at above native resolution. Each frame is then downsampled to native resolution. This process is an alternative to supersampling which is not supported by all games. Virtual super resolution is similar to Dynamic Super Resolution, a feature available on competing nVidia graphics cards, but trades flexibility for increased performance.

OpenCL (API) 

OpenCL accelerates many scientific Software Packages against CPU up to factor 10 or 100 and more.
Open CL 1.0 to 1.2 are supported for all chips with Terascale and GCN Architecture. OpenCL 2.0 is supported with GCN 2nd Gen. and higher.   For OpenCL 2.1 and 2.2 only Driver Updates are necessary with OpenCL 2.0 conformant Cards.

Vulkan (API) 

API Vulkan 1.0 is supported for all GCN architecture cards. Vulkan 1.2 requires GCN 2nd gen or higher with the Adrenalin 20.1 and Linux Mesa 20.0 drivers and newer.

Chipset tables

Desktop models

Mobile models

Radeon Feature Matrix

Graphics device drivers

Proprietary graphics device driver Catalyst 

AMD Catalyst is being developed for Microsoft Windows and Linux. As of July 2014, other operating systems are not officially supported. This may be different for the AMD FirePro brand, which is based on identical hardware but features OpenGL-certified graphics device drivers.

AMD Catalyst supports all features advertised for the Radeon brand.

Free and open-source graphics device driver radeon 

The free and open-source drivers are primarily developed on and for Linux, but have been ported to other operating systems as well. Each driver is composed out of five parts:

 Linux kernel component DRM
 Linux kernel component KMS driver: basically the device driver for the display controller
 user-space component libDRM
 user-space component in Mesa 3D
 a special and distinct 2D graphics device driver for X.Org Server, which is finally about to be replaced by Glamor

The free and open-source radeon kernel driver supports most of the features implemented into the Radeon line of GPUs.

The radeon kernel driver is not reverse engineered, but based on documentation released by AMD. This driver still requires proprietary microcode to operate DRM functions and some GPUs may fail to launch the X server if not available.

Free and open-source graphics device driver amdgpu 
This new kernel driver is directly supported and developed by AMD. It is available on various Linux distributions, and has been ported to some other operating systems as well. Only GCN GPUs are supported.

Proprietary graphics device driver AMDGPU-PRO 
This new driver by AMD was still undergoing development in 2018, but could be used on a few supported Linux distributions already (AMD officially supports Ubuntu, RHEL/CentOS). The driver has been experimentally ported to ArchLinux and other distributions. AMDGPU-PRO is set to replace the previous AMD Catalyst driver and is based on the free and open source amdgpu kernel driver. Pre-GCN GPUs are not supported.

See also 
 Graphics Core Next
 AMD FirePro
 AMD FireMV
 AMD FireStream
 List of AMD graphics processing units

References

AMD graphics cards
Computer-related introductions in 2015
Graphics processing units
Graphics cards